Robert Gerard Drontmann (born 1 June 1968 in The Hague) is a sailor from the Netherlands, who was world champion in the Cadet class in 1985 and represented his country at the 1988 Summer Olympics in Pusan. With his older brother Mark Drontmann as crew, Drontman took the 9th place in the 470 Male.

Professional life
Drontmann works since 2009 as Sales Manager & Yacht Broker at Moonen shipyard, 's-Hertogenbosch.

Sources
 
 
 
 
 
 
 

Living people
1968 births
Sportspeople from The Hague
Dutch male sailors (sport)
Sailors at the 1988 Summer Olympics – 470
Olympic sailors of the Netherlands
Snipe class sailors
Cadet class world champions